Thornhill is a village and civil parish in the county of Derbyshire, England, in the Peak District, south of Ladybower Reservoir and east of Castleton. The population of the civil parish at the 2011 census was 154.

See also
Listed buildings in Thornhill, Derbyshire

References

External links
Parish Council website

Villages in Derbyshire
Towns and villages of the Peak District
High Peak, Derbyshire